Diversity, equity, and inclusion (DEI) is a conceptual framework that seeks to promote the fair treatment and full participation of all people, especially in the workplace, including populations who have historically been under-represented or subject to discrimination because of their background, identity, disability, etc.

"Diversity" describes a wide variety of differences that may exist amongst people in any community, including race, ethnicity, nationality, gender and sexual identity, disability, neurodiversity, and others. "Equity" is the practice of providing fair opportunities via personalized approaches based on individual needs, thus aiming to "level the playing field" by taking into account the different starting points of different individuals. Therefore, "equity" aims to achieve fairness by considering each individual's trajectory and context, and differs noticeably from the notion of "equality" which aims to treat everyone the same. "Inclusion" specifies the desired outcome, namely, ensuring that individuals find opportunities and spaces to participate, regardless of their differences. 

The term DEI is most often used to describe a training in the workplace. DEI training is utilized to encourage functional knowledge of fellow employees' identities and ways to navigate differences in an organization. That said, the concept of DEI has a much broader scope of application. The umbrella term "diversity" encompasses not only the awareness about differences but also a set of principles and practices that aim to transform that awareness into safe and positive working environments. Equity involves factoring in individuals' starting points and trajectories. Applying equity means implementing fair opportunities in a way that accounts for the differences that exist between individuals. Inclusion is a step towards integration, where diverse individuals blend into the environment safely and harmoniously.

Some of the challenges facing DEI have historical roots, with trails into current-time society. Due to the complexity of these issues in society, DEI is not simple or cookie-cutter. Though DEI is best known as a form of corporate training, these angles can be explored in a variety of environments, including but not limited to academia, corporate workplaces, schools, and medical spaces.

In the workplace

Organizations are now cognizant of the fact that efforts toward diversity, equity, and inclusion produce a tangible result. The purpose of DEI training is to encourage self awareness, cultural competency, and empathy in employees; addressing unconscious bias, as well as promoting an overall safe, welcoming workplace environment for those of all races, creeds, and ethnicity. The application of DEI training is not ready-made by any means, and proper application and upkeep requires administrative awareness of corporate social responsibility. This specific implementation of DEI training is relatively new, but people have been organically navigating differences for a long time. Because businesses and corporations exist within a larger world, they cannot be completely separated from the issues that exist in society. Thus, DEI is quickly becoming an integral part of human resources in education and prevention. The implementation, monitoring, and upkeep of a DEI informed workplace improves coworker relations and teamwork. The text scrutinizes the rationale behind taking action and outlines the measures that companies can adopt to effectively execute an DEI (Diversity, Equality, and Inclusion) plan. These measures include recruiting and retaining personnel, fostering effective communication channels, imparting relevant training, and regulating workplace conduct.

In academia 

Though the term and application was more prominent in the civil rather than the corporate sector, many of the academic institutions started making commitments to DEI in different ways, including creating documents, programs and appointing dedicated staff members especially in the US. Many accreditation agencies now require supporting DEI.

Information on DEI for both students and professors is now widespread in colleges and universities, with many schools requiring training and meetings on the topic. Many scholarships and opportunities at universities even have a secondary purpose of encouraging diversity. Diversity in higher education can be difficult, with diverse students often feeling reduced to fulfilling a ‘diversity quota,’ which can carry a high emotional tax. This said, research is being done across the world to determine the current standpoint of diversity in universities, what is and is not effective, and how DEI practices can be applied in higher education.

Another angle to DEI in education considers public schools and general K-12 education. The focus here is on teachers and administrative staff. Extending this lens of equity to lower education is duplicating what has already been seen in higher education: the creation and upkeep of a safe and supported environment for diverse students. In Democratic-leaning states, some schools have even created administrative positions focused on DEI and social responsibility. Such positions exist with the goal of creating allies for students through resources and staff training in order to support students facing social disparities.

In medicine 
Acknowledging the importance of diversity awareness in medicine and treatment has been a massive step in the medical world. The realm of both academic and applied medicine has been historically white, male, cisgender, and straight, and many diverse individuals have spoken about alienating experiences in this field. Upon more recent research, it has been found that not only are diverse individuals made to feel unsafe and unwelcome, they may also be experiencing inadequate treatment based on their differences. DEI is vital in medicine as physical differences in diverse individuals in the past have led to improper care and less than ideal interactions with medical staff. It has also been shown that greater diversity can strengthen both research teams and patient relations. DEI efforts in existing global health organisations has been criticised for not  being able to dismantle the feudal structure of global health.

While DEI often involves human to human treatment, the increase of artificial intelligence (AI) in health care raises issues of bias and equity issues in how applications are developed and implemented. A recent scoping review identified 18 equity issues with 15 strategies that can be implemented to address them to ensure applications developed equitably meet the needs of the populations intended to benefit from them.

Revenues
According to a 2003 estimate, corporations in the United States spend $8 billion annually on diversity. New York magazine stated in 2021 that "the business became astronomically larger than ever" after the murder of George Floyd in May 2020.

See also
 Affirmative action
 Environmental, social, and corporate governance
 Diversity (business)
 Diversity training
 Human resources
 Inclusion (disability rights)
 Inclusion (education)
 Title IX

References

Multiculturalism
Affirmative action
Corporate social responsibility
Ecofeminism
Environmentalism
Feminism
Social justice
Human resource management
Identity politics
Intersectionality
Workplace
Liberalism
Left-wing politics
Progressivism